No. 549 Squadron RAF was a fighter squadron of the Royal Air Force (RAF) operating in Australia from 1943 to 1945.

History
The squadron was formed at Lawnton Airfield, Queensland Australia on 15 December 1943, made up of RAF Aircrew and RAAF groundstaff, to provide air defence duties with Spitfires, as the RAAF Kittyhawks were inadequate for interception missions. On 1 January they moved to Petrie Airfield, Strathpine, Queensland. In April 1944 the squadron's Spitfires arrived.  May 1944 the unit moved to RAAF Base Amberley, Queensland, while June saw a move to Strauss Airfield, Northern Territory with a detachment at Truscott Airfield, Western Australia. On 5 September 1944 it joined sister unit No. 548 Squadron RAF on a sweep over Selaru Island, 300 miles north of Darwin. In October they went to Parap Airfield (Darwin/Civil), Northern Territory, maintaining their detachment in Truscott. On 27 November they went over Timor. Throughout its life the Squadron was commanded by Sqn Ldr E.P.W. Bocock. The squadron was disbanded, according to some sources, at Parap Airfield,  Darwin, on 9 October 1945. However, a more recent source states that disbandment occurred on 31 October, at Melbourne. Afterwards, the RAF personnel returned to the United Kingdom.

Aircraft operated

Squadron bases

Commanding officers

See also
List of Royal Air Force aircraft squadrons

References

Notes

Bibliography

External links
 The history of No. 549 Squadron at raf.mod.uk
 History of No.'s 541–598 Squadrons at RAF Web

Fighter squadrons of the Royal Air Force in World War II
549 Squadron
Military units and formations established in 1943